The Iceland men's national basketball team represents Iceland in international basketball tournaments. The team is controlled by the Icelandic Basketball Association.

Iceland has qualified for the EuroBasket twice, with the national team making their first ever appearance in 2015. They also participate at smaller European tournaments, such as the Games of the Small States of Europe. Although Iceland has yet to make their debut entrance on to the global stage at the FIBA World Cup.

History

EuroBasket 2015
On 28 August 2014, Iceland qualified for the EuroBasket 2015, entering the finals of the top European competition for the first time in its history. The national team though didn't fare too well in their maiden voyage at the EuroBasket. Finishing (0-5) in their Group B pool, played in Berlin with defeats at the hands of Germany, Italy, Serbia, Spain, and Turkey. Overall it was a memorable moment for Iceland, where they finally achieved the feat of competing at a major international tournament, after numerous failed qualifications in the past.

EuroBasket 2017
On 17 September 2016, Iceland repeated their success and qualified to the continental tournament once again. The national team finished its qualification group as the runners-up behind Belgium, and above Cyprus and Switzerland, with four wins and two losses.

As in the previous edition though, Iceland finished their participation with five loses in five matches played in their Group A pool in Helsinki.

EuroBasket 2022 qualification
After failing to qualify for the 2019 FIBA World Cup, Iceland turned the page toward EuroBasket 2021. To attempt to qualify for three consecutive EuroBasket appearances, Iceland was placed into Group C to begin their pre-qualifying campaign, which began with two straight loses to Portugal, and Belgium. Although the national team would pick up their first win in their third game, a rematch with Portugal at home in Reykjavík. In their final match of group play the team fell to Belgium, and would have to survive the final window of pre-qualifiers if they were to advance.

For the final phase of pre-qualifiers, Iceland was placed into Group H, alongside Portugal once again, and Switzerland. The national team opened up group play with a tough loss on the road against Portugal 80–79. Looking to even their record at (1-1), Iceland was at home against Switzerland. The match stayed close throughout until Martin Hermannsson's heroics showed up late in the fourth quarter for Iceland; where his jumpshot in the final seconds gave the home side an momentous 83–82 victory. Heading into their next match the national team looked to capitalize on their last win. They did so in thorough fashion, dismantling Portugal 96–68 to set up one last show down with the Swiss.

Heading into the final match day with a place in the qualifiers on the line, Iceland needed to defeat Switzerland on the road in an hostile environment. The specifics for Iceland was clear, either win to clinch a spot, or avoid losing by 18 or more points. Unfortunately, the unthinkable happened. As the national team not only lost to Switzerland, but failed to cover the point difference needed to advance. Losing 109–85, eliminating any chance for Iceland to reach the finals for the third straight time.

Competitive record

FIBA World Cup

Olympic Games

Games of the Small States of Europe

EuroBasket

Championship for Small Countries

Results and fixtures

2021

2022

2023

Team

Current roster
Roster for the 2023 FIBA World Cup Qualifiers matches on 23 and 26 February 2023 against Spain and Georgia.

Depth chart

Head coach position
 Hilmar Hafsteinsson – (1984)
 Einar Bollason – (1985–1987)
 László Németh – (1988–1990)
 Torfi Magnússon – (1990–1995)
 Jón Kr. Gíslason – (1995–1999)
 Friðrik Ingi Rúnarsson – (1999–2003)
 Sigurður Ingimundarson – (2004–2009)
 Peter Öqvist – (2011–2013)
 Craig Pedersen – (2014–present)

Individual records

Players with the most caps (games played) 
Players in bold are still active.

Past rosters
2015 EuroBasket: finished 24th among 24 teams

3 Martin Hermannsson, 4 Axel Kárason, 5 Ragnar Nathanaelsson, 6 Jakob Sigurðarson, 8 Hlynur Bæringsson (C),9 Jón Arnór Stefánsson, 10 Helgi Már Magnússon, 13 Hörður Vilhjálmsson, 14 Logi Gunnarsson, 15 Pavel Ermolinskij,24 Haukur Pálsson, 29 Ægir Steinarsson (Coach: Craig Pedersen)

2017 EuroBasket: finished 24th among 24 teams

1 Martin Hermannsson, 3 Ægir Steinarsson, 6 Kristófer Acox, 8 Hlynur Bæringsson (C), 9 Jón Arnór Stefánsson,10 Elvar Már Friðriksson, 13 Hörður Vilhjálmsson, 14 Logi Gunnarsson, 15 Pavel Ermolinskij, 24 Haukur Pálsson, 34 Tryggvi Hlinason, 88 Brynjar Þór Björnsson (Coach: Craig Pedersen)

See also

Sport in Iceland
Iceland women's national basketball team
Iceland men's national under-20 basketball team
Iceland men's national under-18 basketball team
Iceland men's national under-16 basketball team

Notes

References

External links
Official website 
Iceland FIBA profile
Iceland National Team – Men at Eurobasket.com

Basketball
Men's national basketball teams
 
1959 establishments in Iceland